Marthinus Johannes Louw  (20 April 1938 – 12 October 2013) was a South African rugby union player, coach and administrator.

Biography

Louw played two test matches for the Springboks, both during the 1971 tour of Australia. He played loose-head prop in the second and third tests, after is provincial teammate, Sakkie Sauermann played in the first test. He also played in seven tour matches.

After his playing career, Louw acted as a Transvaal selector and vice-chairman and selector of the  Rugby Union when it became a separate Union in 1984. He also coached Vaal Triangle.

Test history

See also
List of South Africa national rugby union players – Springbok no. 454

References

1938 births
2013 deaths
South African rugby union players
South Africa international rugby union players
Golden Lions players
Rugby union players from Germiston
Rugby union props